Iva Prčić (born February 17, 1987) is a former Serbian female basketball player.

Personal life
Iva is a twin sister of Serbian basketball player Dunja Prčić.

External links
Profile at eurobasket.com

1987 births
Living people
Sportspeople from Subotica
Croats of Vojvodina
Serbian women's basketball players
Shooting guards
ŽKK Crvena zvezda players
ŽKK Spartak Subotica players